Bareh may refer to:
 Bareh, Marand, East Azerbaijan Province
 Bareh, Tabriz, East Azerbaijan Province
 Bareh, West Azerbaijan